James Alexander Pearson (born 11 September 1983) is an English cricketer.  Pearson is a left-handed batsman.  He was born in Bristol and for a brief period attended Clifton College.

Pearson represented the Gloucestershire Cricket Board in 2 List A matches.  These came against Herefordshire in the 2nd round of the 2001 Cheltenham & Gloucester Trophy and the Yorkshire Cricket Board in the 2nd round of the 2002 Cheltenham & Gloucester Trophy which was played in 2001.

In 2002, Pearson made his first-class debut for Gloucestershire against Northamptonshire in the County Championship.  From 2002 to 2005, he represented the county in 8 first-class matches, the last of which came against Bangladesh A.  In his 8 first-class matches, he scored 320 runs at a batting average of 22.85, with 3 half centuries and a high score of 68.  In the field he took 4 catches.  In 2002, he played his only List A match for the county, which was also his last in that format, against West Indies A.  In his career total of 3 List A matches, he scored 7 runs at an average of 2.33, with a high score of 7.  In the field he took a single catch, while with the ball he took a single wicket at a cost of 29 runs.

In 2006, he played a single Minor Counties Championship match for Wiltshire against Herefordshire.

He currently plays club cricket for Bristol West Indians Cricket Club.

References

External links
James Pearson at Cricinfo
James Pearson at CricketArchive

1983 births
People educated at Clifton College
Living people
Cricketers from Bristol
English cricketers
Gloucestershire Cricket Board cricketers
Gloucestershire cricketers
Wiltshire cricketers